Ammittamru II was a king of the ancient Syrian city of Ugarit who ruled from 1260 to 1235 BC. He reigned for 25 years, being the son of former king Niqmepa, who was famously forced to sign a treaty of vassalization to the Hittites.

His mother Ahatmilku supported his succession to the throne after the death of his father. She banished two of her sons to Alashiya (Cyprus), when they contested this, but made sure they had sufficient supplies.

Like all other Ugaritan kings, very few references of him exist. However, he is known to be a contemporary of Bentešina of the Amurru. Ammittamru II married Bentešina's daughter whose mother was Kiluš-Ḫepa, daughter of Ḫattušili III. He later expelled his wife after she had committed serious misconduct and sent her back to Amurru. He then demanded her extradition in order to punish her for her deeds, but Šaušgamuwa of the Amurru refused to extradite the lady because he feared her execution. As tension arose between the two vassals, Hittite king Tudḫaliya IV interfered in the matter, as an escalating conflict between two important vassals would not have been in his favor. Hence, Hittite viceroy in Carchemish, Ini-Teššup, decided that the ex-wife would have to be extradited and Šaušgamuwa should be paid 1400 shekels of gold to in return.

Ammittamru II is assumed to have used the seal of his grandfather, Niqmaddu II instead of the dynastic seal that reads: "Yaqarum, son of Niqmaddu, king of Ugarit", that was normally used by Ugaritan kings.

Ammittamru II determined his son Ibiranu as his successor during his lifetime.

References

Ugaritic kings
13th-century BC people